Chauncey Langdon (November 8, 1763July 23, 1830) was an American politician, lawyer and judge. He served as a  United States Representative from Vermont.

Early life
Langdon was born to Ebenezer and Katherine (Green) Langdon in Farmington in the Connecticut Colony. Pursuing classical studies, he graduated from Yale College in 1787. He then studied at the Litchfield Law School and with Judge Sylvester Gilbert, of Hebron, Connecticut, and was admitted to the bar. He began the practice of law in Castleton, Vermont.

Career
Langdon became an active Federalist. He practiced law in  Windsor, but later returned to Castleton. He served as the Rutland County Register of Probate from 1792 to 1794, in 1796, and again in 1813. He was Judge of Probate in 1798 and 1799.  In 1808 he served on the state Executive Council. He received an honorary degree at Middlebury Collegein Vermont in 1803 and was a trustee from 1811 until his death. He was a member of the Vermont House of Representatives in 1813, 1814, 1817, 1819, 1820, and 1822.

Langdon was elected as a Federalist to the Fourteenth Congress, serving from March 4, 1815 until March 3, 1817. He was not a candidate for renomination to the Fifteenth Congress. He was again elected to the Executive Council and served from 1823 until his death.

Family life
He married Lucy Nona Lathrop Langdon on April 7, 1789. They had one son, Benjamin Franklin Langdon, and one daughter, Lucy Green Langdon Williams, who married Governor Charles K. Williams.

Death
Langdon died in Castleton on July 23, 1830. He is interred in Castleton's Congregational Cemetery. He was also an officer of the Vermont Bible Society.

References

External links

Litchfield Historical Society
Chauncey Langdon

The Political Graveyard

1763 births
1830 deaths
People from Farmington, Connecticut
People of colonial Connecticut
American people of English descent
Federalist Party members of the United States House of Representatives from Vermont
People from Castleton, Vermont
Vermont state court judges
Yale College alumni
Litchfield Law School alumni
Burials in Vermont